Brestsky Uyezd (Брестский уезд) was one of the nine subdivisions of the Grodno Governorate of the Russian Empire. It was situated in the southwestern part of the governorate. Its administrative centre was Brest (Brest-Litovsk).

Demographics
At the time of the Russian Empire Census of 1897, Brestsky Uyezd had a population of 218,432. Of these, 64.4% spoke Ukrainian, 20.8% Yiddish, 8.1% Russian, 3.9% Polish, 1.8% Belarusian, 0.2% German, 0.2% Tatar, 0.2% Mordvin and 0.1% Latvian as their native language.

References

 
Uezds of Grodno Governorate
Grodno Governorate